John Allyn (May 17, 1917 in Chicago, Illinois – April 29, 1979 in Winnetka, Illinois) was the co-owner of the Chicago White Sox of the American League with his brother Arthur Allyn, Jr. from  through , and sole principal owner from  through . In addition, John Allyn served as president of the Chicago Mustangs soccer team which he co-owned with his brother, Arthur.  In 1975, Allyn sold the club back to the person he and his brother had purchased it from in 1961, Bill Veeck.

References
White Sox History on Baseball Library

1917 births
1979 deaths
Major League Baseball executives
Major League Baseball owners
Chicago White Sox owners
North American Soccer League (1968–1984) executives
Sportspeople from Chicago